The Boy Who Kicked Pigs is a short novel by actor Tom Baker. The novel is subtitled, "A grotesque masterpiece", and is illustrated with line drawings by David Roberts.

Plot 

The novel begins by announcing that today will be the day that a young boy, Robert Caligari, dies. Robert is an extremely odd boy who cannot stop himself from kicking pigs. This begins as a private act of revenge against his sister, Nerys, who is always putting money in her own tin piggy bank. Robert is angry at Nerys constantly rattling the pig in front of him and so takes great pleasure in kicking the pig across the room whenever he is alone.

Robert's obsession with kicking pigs gets worse and one day, he kicks his sister's piggy bank out of the window, causing chaos for his neighbors and a local police officer. The last straw for Robert's mother is when he kicks a rather large woman's bagged pork chops, which she had just bought at the local butcher's shop.

After a local man finally gets revenge on Robert by throwing him over a church wall, Robert realizes that he hates people. While Robert's neighbors soon come to the conclusion that he is a nice young boy, he is plotting revenge. After poisoning his sister's food, he decides to trick an old blind man into crossing a road of busy traffic. Unfortunately for the old man, this proves fatal, yet nobody suspects Robert's involvement.

Robert engineers another, far worse, road accident in the next step of his evil plan. However, in the process of doing so, he finds himself trapped in his secret hideaway, where he is about to face a truly terrible fate.

Adaptations 
The book has been adapted for stage by theatre company Kill the Beast, and was performed at The Lowry, Greater Manchester, 21–23 June 2012 and at Jacksons Lane, London.

References 

1999 British novels
Faber and Faber books
Pigs in literature